Events from the year 1935 in France.

Incumbents
President: Albert Lebrun 
President of the Council of Ministers: 
 until 1 June: Pierre-Étienne Flandin
 1 June-7 June: Fernand Bouisson
 starting 7 June: Pierre Laval

Events
 January – Foreign Minister Pierre Laval went to Rome to meet Italian Prime Minister Benito Mussolini.
7 January – Franco-Italian Agreement is signed in Rome in which each power undertakes not to oppose the other's colonial claims.
14 April – Stresa Front agreement is concluded between France, Britain and Italy.
2 May – Franco-Soviet Treaty of Mutual Assistance is concluded.
December – Hoare–Laval Pact signed with Great Britain.

Sport
4 July – Tour de France begins.
28 July – Tour de France ends, won by Romain Maes of Belgium

Births

2 February – Jean-Louis Verdier, mathematician (died 1989)
12 March 
Jacques Benveniste, immunologist (died 2004)
Paul John Marx, French-Papua Roman Catholic prelate (died 2018)
1 June – Jacqueline Naze Tjøtta, mathematician (died 2017).
15 June – Robert Lamartine, soccer player (died 1990)
21 June – Françoise Sagan, playwright, novelist and screenwriter (died 2004)
24 August – Christian Liger, French writer (died 2002)
18 September – Raymond Vautherin, French-Italian linguist, poet and playwright (died 2018)
25 September – Adrien Douady, mathematician (died 2006)
8 October – Albert Roux, chef (died 2021)
8 November – Alain Delon, actor

Deaths
12 February – Auguste Escoffier, chef, restaurateur and culinary writer (born 1846)
17 May – Paul Dukas, composer and teacher (born 1865)
3 July – André Citroën, automobile pioneer (born 1878)
12 July – Alfred Dreyfus, military officer, victim in the Dreyfus Affair (born 1859)
30 August – Henri Barbusse, novelist, journalist and communist (born 1873)
4 October – Jean Béraud, painter and commercial artist (born 1849)
4 December – Charles Richet, physiologist, awarded Nobel Prize for Physiology or Medicine in 1913 (born 1850)
13 December – Victor Grignard, chemist, shared the Nobel Prize in Chemistry in 1912 (born 1871)

See also
 List of French films of 1935

References

1930s in France